WDML (106.9 FM, "Adult Rock & Roll") is a radio station broadcasting a classic rock format. Licensed to Woodlawn, Illinois, United States, and broadcasting in the Mount Vernon area, the station is owned by Dana Withers' Withers Broadcasting, through licensee WDML, LLC. The station is an affiliate of the syndicated Pink Floyd program "Floydian Slip."

References

External links

Classic rock radio stations in the United States
DML
Jefferson County, Illinois
Radio stations established in 1994
1994 establishments in Illinois